Ellen Evert Hopman (born July 31, 1952, in Salzburg, Austria) is an author of both fiction and non-fiction, an herbalist, a lay homeopath, a lecturer, and a Mental Health Counselor who lives and works in Western Massachusetts. She is the author of several books and audio tapes on Paganism and Druidry, and three novels. She is a certified writing teacher with Amherst Writers and Artists and a multiple recipient of the Golden Oak Award. She was formerly a Professor of Wortcunning at the Grey School of Wizardry, where she taught herbalism, Celtic Neopaganism, Celtic history and Celtic lore. She is a professional member of the American Herbalist Guild. and a member of the Grey Council of Mages and Sages. She has taught Druidry and herbalism in the United States, Scotland, Ireland and Canada, and has been a speaker and workshop leader at numerous Neopagan and New Age events, and a subject of articles in The New York Times.

Education
Hopman graduated summa cum laude from Temple University, Philadelphia, PA with a B.S. in Art Education, and received a master's degree in Mental Health Counseling from the University of Massachusetts (Amherst) in 1990. She trained in Herbalism primarily with William LeSassier in New York in 1983, at the Findhorn Foundation in Scotland under Barbara D'Arcy Thompson, and received professional training at the National Center for Homeopathy.

Druidry
Hopman joined the modern Druidic organization Ar nDraiocht Fein in 1984. She is a co-founder and former co-Chief of The Order of Whiteoak (Ord na Darach Gile), a Reconstructionist Druid organization. She is also Archdruid and founder, Tribe of the Oak (Tuatha na Dara), www.tribeoftheoak.com. She held the position of vice president of the Henge of Keltria, an international Druid Fellowship, for nine years. She has been on the staff of Keltria: Journal of Druidism and Celtic Magick and has been a contributing author to many New Age and Pagan journals. She was the founder of The New England Druid Summit, a yearly gathering of Druids in New England. In 2009 she presented a paper on Celtic Cosmology at the International Center for Cultural Studies (ICCS) Conference on Spirituality in Indigenous Cultural and Religious Traditions.

Broadcast media
Hopman has appeared on several radio and television programs including National Public Radio’s Vox Pop and the Gary Null Show in New York City. She was also featured in a segment of the series Living the Wiccan Life produced by The Witch School. She presented a weekly "herb report" for WRSI radio in Greenfield, MA, and was featured in a documentary about Druids on A&E Television’s The Unexplained (Sacred Societies, February 1999).

Books
1992 - Tree Medicine, Tree Magic. Illustrated by Diana Green. Seattle, WA: Phoenix Publishing. 
1994 - A Druid's Herbal for the Sacred Earth Year. Destiny Books. 
1995 - People of the Earth: The New Pagans Speak Out (with Lawrence Bond) . Inner Traditions. 
2000 - Walking the World in Wonder: A Children's Herbal (with Steven Foster, photographer). Healing Arts Press. 
2001 - Being a Pagan: Druids, Wiccans, and Witches Today (with Lawrence Bond). (Revision of People of the Earth: The New Pagans Speak Out) Destiny Books. 
2008 - Priestess of the Forest: A Druid Journey. Llewellyn Publications. 
2008 - A Druids Herbal of Sacred Tree Medicine. Inner Traditions International. 
2010 - The Druid Isle. Lewellyn. 
2010 - Making Kitchen Medicines -  A Practical Guide. Dreamz-Work Productions, LLC 
2011 - Scottish Herbs and Fairy Lore. Pendraig Publishing 
2012 - Priestess of the Fire Temple - A Druid's Tale. LLewellyn. 
2012 - The Secret Medicine of Your Kitchen. mPowr Publishing, London  
2016 - A Legacy of Druids - Conversations with Druid leaders of Britain, the USA and Canada, Past and present 
2016 - Secret Medicines from Your Garden: Plants for Healing, Spirituality, and Magic. Healing Arts Press 
2018 - The Real Witches of New England: History, Lore, and Modern Practice. Destiny Books 
2018 - Tree Medicine Tree Magic: 2nd Edition. Pendraig Publishing. 
2019 - The Sacred Herbs of Samhain. Destiny Books 
2020 - The Sacred Herbs of Spring. Destiny Books 
2022 - Once Around the Sun. Destiny Books 

Video
 Gifts from the Healing Earth: Volume I. Sawmill River Productions 
 Gifts from the Healing Earth: Volume II. Sawmill River Productions
 Pagans: The Wheel of the Sacred Year. Sawmill River Productions 
 Celtic Cosmology (2009) Sawmill River Productions

References
10. Secret Medicines from Your Garden WINNER of the 2016 Thomas DeBaggio International Herb Association Annual Book Award

Further reading
 Dougherty, Anne Kathleen (December 11, 2004) Herbal Voices: American Herbalism Through the Words of American Herbalists (pgs 217-226) Routledge ,  
 Wildman, Laura (2005) Celebrating the Pagan Soul'' (pgs 100-103) Citadel Press , 
 Druids: Moving Forward, Remembering the Past in Patheos, Aug. 23, 2010
 Ellen Evert Hopman: Herbalist, Scholar, Celtic Pagan. Interview with Carl McColeman - originally printed in New Leaves (March/April 1999 issue) 
 The Herbalist's Path: Ellen Evert Hopman in Witches and Pagans, Sept. 12, 2013 in Witches and Pagans
 A Basic Herbal Liqueur Recipe in Witches and Pagans, Aug. 26, 2013
 Hag's Tapers for Halloween in Witches and Pagans, Sept. 12, 2013
 Wildcrafting Herbs: Know Your Roots in Witches and Pagans, Oct. 5, 2013
 Bee Medicine – The Splendors of Honey in Witches and Pagans, Nov. 18, 2013
 Communicating with Plants in Witches and Pagans, Dec. 20, 2013
 Tortorello, Michael (Oct. 30, 2013) If a Druid Rings the Doorbell, New York Times Home & Garden Section
 Tortorello, Michael (Oct. 30, 2013) Plants With Spirit, New York Times Home & Garden Section
 Pagans: The Wheel of the Year (1999) (Excerpt of DVD)
 Gifts from the Healing Earth – Vol I (Excerpt of DVD)
 Blackwell, Christopher (Imbolc 2014) Catching up with a Busy Druid: Interview with Ellen Evert Hopman - Herbalist, Author and Druid, Action Magazine
 Greenfield Recorder interview, Secret Medicines from Your Garden with Ellen Evert Hopman (August 20, 2016)
A Faerie Interview with Ellen Evert Hopman.  Faerie Magazine, September, 2018.

External links
Willow's Grove - Ellen Evert Hopman - Ellen Evert Hopman's website
Ord na Darach Gile - Druid Order of WhiteOak

Living people
Writers from Massachusetts
Austrian emigrants to the United States
University of Massachusetts Amherst alumni
Neo-druids
Herbalists
1952 births
Austrian modern pagans
Modern pagan novelists
Modern pagan writers